Silvia Moreno-Garcia (born 25 April 1981) is a Mexican Canadian novelist, short story writer, editor, and publisher.

Early life and education
Moreno-Garcia was born 25 April 1981, and raised in Mexico.  Both her parents worked for radio stations. She moved to Canada in 2004. Moreno-Garcia completed a master's degree in science and technology studies from the University of British Columbia, Vancouver in 2016. She presently lives with her family in Vancouver, British Columbia.

Career
Moreno-Garcia began her career publishing in various fiction magazines and books, including Exile Quarterly.  She was a finalist for the 2011 Manchester Fiction Prize. Her first short story collection, This Strange Way of Dying, was published in September 2013 by Exile Editions.  Her second collection, Love and Other Potions, came out in 2014 from Innsmouth Free Press.  Her debut novel, Signal to Noise, was published in 2015 by Solaris Books.

She serves as publisher of Innsmouth Free Press, an imprint devoted to weird fiction. With Paula R. Stiles, she co-edited the books Historical Lovecraft (2011), Future Lovecraft (2012), Sword and Mythos (2014), and She Walks In Shadows (2015).  With Orrin Grey, she co-edited Fungi (2013), a collection of "fungal fiction". With Lavie Tidhar, she edits The Jewish Mexican Literary Review.  In 2016, she won a World Fantasy Award for the anthology She Walks in Shadows and a Copper Cylinder Award for her novel Signal to Noise.

As of October 2019 Moreno-Garcia is a book columnist for The Washington Post.

In February 2020 she was announced as a finalist for the Nebula Award 2019 in the Best Novel category for her book Gods of Jade and Shadow.

In 2023 her novel Mexican Gothic was selected for the 2023 edition of Canada Reads, where it will be championed by Tasnim Geedi.<ref>"Meet the Canada Reads 2023 contenders". CBC Books, January 25, 2023.</ref>

Awards

Bibliography
Novels
 
 
  
 
 
  
  
 
 

Chapbooks

 
 
  

Collections
 This Strange Way of Dying (2013)
 Other Lives (2013)
 Love and Other Poisons (2014)

Short fiction

 "Mirror Life" (2006; collected in Other Lives (2013))
 "King of Sand and Stormy Seas" (2006; collected in Other Lives (2013))
 "Water" (2007)
 "Shedding Her Own Skin" (2007)
 "Candles for the Dead" (2008)
 "Maquech" (2008; collected in This Strange Way of Dying (2013))
 "Of Fire and Time" (2008)
 "Enchantment" (2008)
 "Return" (2008)
 "Jaguar Woman" (2009; collected in This Strange Way of Dying (2013))
 "Bed of Scorpions" (2009; collected in This Strange Way of Dying (2013))
 "B'alam" (2009)
 "Sinking Palaces" (2009)
 "The Harpy" (2010)
 "Distant Deeps or Skies" (2010)
 "Seeds" (2010)
 "Salt" (2010; collected in Other Lives (2013))
 "The Manticore" (2010)
 "Weekday" (2010)
 "Bloodlines" (2010; collected in This Strange Way of Dying (2013))
 "Driving with Aliens in Tijuana" (2010; collected in This Strange Way of Dying (2013))
 "The English Cemetery" (2011)
 "Flash Frame" (2011; collected in This Strange Way of Dying (2013))
 "The Death Collector" (2011; collected in This Strange Way of Dying (2013))
 "At the Edge" (2011)
 "Shade of the Ceibra Tree" (2011; collected in This Strange Way of Dying (2013))
 "Scales as Pale as Moonlight" (2011; collected in This Strange Way of Dying (2013))
 "A Handful of Earth" (2011)
 "This Strange Way of Dying" (2011; collected in This Strange Way of Dying (2013))
 "A Puddle of Blood" (2011)
 "Memory" (2011)
 "Collect Call" (2012)
 "The Performance" (2012)
 "In the House of the Hummingbirds" (2012)
 "The Doppelgangers" (2012; collected in This Strange Way of Dying (2013))
 "The Cemetery Man" (2013; collected in This Strange Way of Dying (2013)) 
 "Iron Justice Versus the Fiends of Evil" (2013)
 "The Gringo" (2013)
 "Nahuales" (2013; collected in This Strange Way of Dying (2013))
 "Them Ships" (2013)
 "Variations of Figures Upon the Wall" (2013)
 "Abandon All Flesh" (2013)
 "River, Dreaming" (2013)
 "Snow" (2013; collected in This Strange Way of Dying (2013))
 "Stories with Happy Endings" (2013; collected in This Strange Way of Dying (2013))
 "The Sea, Like Broken Glass" (2013)
 "Kaleidoscope" (2014)
 "Man in Blue Overcoat" (2014)
 "To See Pedro Infante" (2014)
 "Phrase Book" (2014)
 "Ahuizotl" (2015)
 "Lacrimosa" (2015)
 "In the Details" (2015)
 "Legacy of Salt" (2016)
 "Jade, Blood" (2017)
 Prime Meridian (novella) (2017)
 "Give Me Your Black Wings Oh Sister" (2019)
 "On the Lonely Shore" (2019)
 "Kaleidoscope / Caleidoscopio" (with Carlos Arturo Serrano) (2021)

As editor or co-editor
 Historical Lovecraft: Tales of Horror Through Time (with Paula R. Stiles) (2011)
 Candle in the Attic Window (2011) with Paula R. Stiles
 Future Lovecraft (with Paula R. Stiles) (2012)
 Innsmouth Magazine: Collected Issues 1-4 (with Paula R. Stiles) (2012)
 Innsmouth Magazine: Collected Issues 5-7 (with Paula R. Stiles) (2012)
 Fungi (with Orrin Grey) (2012)
 Dead North: Canadian Zombie Fiction (2013)
 Sword & Mythos (with Paula R. Stiles) (2014)
 Fractured: Tales of the Canadian Post-Apocalypse (2014)
 She Walks in Shadows (with Paula R. Stiles) (2015)
 Nebula Awards Showcase 2019 (2019)

Nonfiction
 A Writer's Guide to Speculative Fiction: Science Fiction and Fantasy''  (with Crawford Kilian) (2019)

References

External links

 Official website
 

1981 births
21st-century Canadian novelists
21st-century Canadian short story writers
21st-century Canadian women writers
Canadian horror writers
Canadian science fiction writers
Canadian women novelists
Canadian women short story writers
Living people
Mexican emigrants to Canada
Women horror writers
Women science fiction and fantasy writers
Writers from Mexico City
Writers from Vancouver
Writers of Gothic fiction